Emilian may refer to:
Emilia (region of Italy), a region of northern Italy
Emilian of Cogolla, a Visigothic saint
Emilian dialects, spoken in Emilia, northern Italy

A Romanian male given name:
Emilian Bratu (1904–1991), chemical engineer
Emilian Dobrescu (born 1933), economist
Emilian Dolha (born 1979), footballer
Emilian Galaicu-Păun (born 1964), author and editor
Emilian Voiutschi (1850–1920), theologian and cleric
Emilian Zabara, sprint canoeist

A Romanian surname:
Celine Emilian (1898–1983), sculptor
Cornelia Emilian (1840–1910), journalist and women's rights activist
Ștefan Emilian (1819–1899), mathematician and architect

See also
Emiliana (disambiguation)
Emiliano, a given name
Emilia (disambiguation)

Romanian masculine given names